Constantine Sathas (Athens, 1842 – Paris, 25 May 1914) was a Greek historian and researcher.

Sathas spent his life unearthing hitherto unknown material pertaining to the history of late medieval and early modern Greece that he later published. He researched archives in Greece, Constantinople (now Istanbul), Venice and Florence. In 1900, he moved to Paris, where he lived until his death.

Many of the numerous documents he brought to light still remain primary sources of information. It can be argued that his work was never fully appreciated and some of his views are regarded eccentric nowadays. Yet, he carried out groundbreaking work and has been considered as the best historian of Greece in the 19th century.

Selected works

In Greek 
The Revolution of the Greek nation in 17th century, Athens, 1865.
The chronicle of Galaxeidi, 1865.
Hellenika Anekdota (Unpublished Greek texts), (2 volumes), 1867.
New Greek Philology. Biographies of illustrious literary Greeks ... 1453 to 1821. 1868.
Greece under Turkish occupation, 1869.
Medieval Library (7 volumes), 1872-1894.
Historical essay on the theatre and music of the Byzantines, 1878.
Cretan theatre, or a collection of unpublished and unknown dramata, 1879.
Greek Stratioti in the West and the revival of the Greek military tactics, 1885.

In French 
Documents inédits relatifs à l'histoire de la Grèce au Moyen Âge publiés sous les auspices de la Chambre des députés de Grèce, Paris, 1880-1890. 9 volumes in French, Italian and Latin languages.
Sur les Commentaires byzantins sur Menandre, Homere, etc.: Notice et textes grecs inédits, Paris, 1876.
Deux lettres inedites de l'empereur Michel Ducas Parapinace à Robert Guiscard rédigées par Michel Psellus, Paris, 1875.
La tradition hellenique et la legende de Phidias de Praxitele et de la fille d'Hippocrate au moyen age, Paris, 1875.
Les exploits de Digenis Akritas: Epopee byzantine du dixième siècle / publiée pour la première fois d'après le manuscrit unique de Trebizonde., Athens, 1875. (with Emile Legrand)

In English 

 He collaborated with J.B. Bury and others for an edition of the History of Michael Psellus (Methuen & Co. London, 1899).

External links 
Konstantinos Sathas at the Institute for Neohellenic Research

References 

1842 births
1914 deaths
19th-century Greek historians
Greek philologists
Writers from Athens
Greek Byzantinists
Greek emigrants to France
Scholars of Byzantine history